The Model 1913 Cavalry Sword, commonly referred to as the Patton Saber, was a cavalry sword designed for the U.S. Army by Second Lieutenant (later General) George S. Patton Jr. in 1913. Patton suggested the revision from a curved sword and edge and cutting technique to a thrusting style of attack, following his extensive training in France.

It had a large, basket-shaped hilt mounting a straight, double-edged, thrusting blade designed for use by light cavalry. Although officially designated a saber, it lacks the curved edge typical of many models of saber.

This weapon, the last sword issued to U.S. cavalry, was never used as intended. At the beginning of U.S. involvement in World War I, several American cavalry units armed with sabers were sent to the front, but they were held back. The character of war had changed, making horse-mounted troops easy prey for enemy troops equipped with Gewehr 98 rifles and MG08 machine guns. Cavalrymen who saw combat did so dismounted, using their horses only to travel, similar to mounted infantry.

History
The saber is traditionally the weapon of the U.S. Cavalry; the 1913 Cavalry saber design replaced the Model 1906 Light Cavalry Saber ("Ames" saber), which itself was little changed from the Model 1860 Light Cavalry Saber.
Patton designed the saber when he was Master of the Sword at the Mounted Service School; unlike earlier revisions of cavalry sabers, however, the 1913 saber was a complete redesign.

Following the 1912 Olympics in Stockholm, Patton traveled with his family to Dresden, Berlin, and Nuremberg. Seeking the greatest swordsman in Europe to study with, Patton was told the "beau sabreur" of the French Army would be the one. Adjutant M. Cléry was a French "master of arms" and instructor of fencing at the Cavalry School at Saumur. Patton went to Saumur to undergo an intense study with the master. Upon his return, Patton wrote a report on his sword studies that was revised for the Army and Navy Journal. Patton's first article for the well-known Cavalry Journal appeared in the March 1913 issue. In the summer of 1913, following his advising the Ordnance Department on sword redesign, Patton was allowed to return to Saumur to study once again under Cléry. Patton was next assigned to the Mounted Service School at Fort Riley, Kansas, as a student and "Master of the Sword", the top instructor in a new course in swordsmanship. It was here he wrote two training manuals in mounted and unmounted swordsmanship, "Saber Exercise 1914", and "Diary of the Instructor in Swordsmanship". Patton's original saber is on display at the General George Patton Museum at Fort Knox, Kentucky.

Design
The design was influenced by the French heavy cavalry sword of the Napoleonic Wars as well as French cavalry doctrine that emphasized the use of the point over the edge and is similar to the French Mle 1896 straight saber (and the previous Mle 1882), with which French cavalry entered the WWI, and the British Pattern 1908 and 1912 cavalry swords.

The Model 1913 saber features a large, basket-shaped hilt mounting a straight, double-edged, thrusting blade designed for use by heavy cavalry. It was designed in accordance with Patton's system of swordsmanship, which was published by the War Department as the 1914 Saber Exercise manual, and which emphasized the use of the point over the edge.

Its design was wrongly thought to have influenced today's Hungarian saber, which is used in sport fencing, however, there is no connection to the modern fencing sabre, which developed from traditional Hungarian and Italian weapons and was introduced in 1910. A modern reproduction is  overall with a  blade and weighs . The blade is straight and tapered, the front edge running the whole length of the blade and double-edged for half its length. Considering the weight of the bell and grip assembly, it would be balanced much closer to the hand than the typical weapon associated with the name "cavalry saber".

It has a blued steel (some were nickel-plated) "cup-hilt" and a black composition grip.
The scabbards (three variants) are of wood covered by leather, then covered with green canvas. The furniture (throat and drag) are of blued steel. Others were nickel plated steel—"garrison scabbards".
It was worn attached to the saddle of the horse, rather than being attached to the waist of the trooper.

Use

According to KJ Parker, Patton's saber was light, slim, exceptionally ergonomic and well-balanced – in short, "more or less perfect, the best sword ever issued to an army." Amberger, on the other hand, considered the weapon to be poorly suited for the cavalry use intended, since at the speed of a cavalry charge, a thrust that transfixed an opponent could not be withdrawn quickly enough, and thus the attacker must either abandon his blade, break his wrist or dislocate his sword arm by holding on to it, or risk worse consequences: "At worst, his dead opponent would drag him off his own horse—making him an unarmed foot soldier in an ocean of falling saber blades and trampling hooves." 

Patton's 1914 manual "Saber Exercise 1914" outlined a system of training for both mounted and on-foot use of the saber. Patton's thoughts were expressed in his 1913 report "The Form and Use of the Saber". He expanded on his "Saber Exercise 1914" manual the next year, at the request of his students at the Mounted Service School in Fort Riley, Kansas, with the publication of "Diary of the Instructor in Swordsmanship". 

In any case, when it was issued, it was already militarily obsolete because modern warfare did not allow the cavalry charges for which it was intended. According to Parker, "if it was ever drawn in anger, I can find no record of it."

References

George S. Patton, Jr. "Diary of the Instructor in Swordsmanship" (Mounted Service School Press, 1915).

External links
Model 1913 Cavalry “Patton” Saber, Springfield Armory Serial Number 1, pp. 24–25. Army History, No. 90, Winter 2013

Swords of the United States
Sabres
Cavalry
1913 in the United States